Raiatea Mokihana Maile Helm (born 8 August 1984) is a Hawaiian music vocalist from Molokaʻi, Hawaiʻi. She has earned four Na Hoku Hanohano awards, as well as two Grammy nominations for Best Hawaiian Music Album.

Helm is best known for her Leo Kiʻekiʻe (Hawaiian falsetto). Helm started her music career when she was 16. At 18 she released her first album, Far Away Heaven, which was critically acclaimed and won her the Na Hoku Hanohano Female Vocalist of the Year Award and the Most Promising Artist Award. Her second album, Sweet and Lovely, earned her four more Na Hoku Hanohano awards, as well as a Grammy nomination for Best Hawaiian Music Album at the 48th Grammy Awards, making Helm the first Hawaiian female vocalist nominated for a Grammy. Her third album, Hawaiian Blossom, earned her further Na Hoku Hanohano awards, as well as a second Grammy nomination. Her 2016 album, He Leo Huali, A Pure Voice, also won her a Na Hoku Hanohano Award.

Helm has recorded with a number of other Hawaiian music artists, such as Keola Beamer, Genoa Keawe, and Kealiʻi Reichel. She studied music at the University of Hawaiʻi at Mānoa.

Raiatea Helm is a descendant of King Kamehameha I, thru Chiefess Keanolani, daughter of Abigail Maheha and Lot Kapuāiwa, who reigned as King of Hawaii from 1863 to 1872. She is the daughter of Zachary Helm and Henrietta Helm, and the niece of Hawaiian musician and sovereignty activist, George Helm.

Discography

References

Further reading
 Raiatea Helm biography.
 KAPA Radio. Raiatea Helm. Big Island News. 23 April 2016.
 Raiatea Helm Heads Back to School. Hawaii News Now. 2011.
 Ledward Kaapana and Raiatea Helm. KITV4 Island News. 8 July 2016.
 Na Hoku Hanohano Finalists Announced. KFVE K5TheHomeTeam. 2011.
 Yerton, Stewart. At the Helm of success. Honolulu Star-Bulletin. 29 October 2006.
 Malama, Derek. Raiatea Helmʻs Gift for the Holiday Season. Hawaii Public Radio. 25 December 2013.
 Coleman, Audrey. Raiatea Helm: Torchbearer of Traditional Hawaiian Music. Ukulele. 19 February 2018.

External links 
 

1984 births
Living people
Singers from Hawaii
Hawaiian music
Mountain Apple Company artists
Na Hoku Hanohano Award winners
21st-century American singers